Benjamin Yurosek is an American football tight end for the Stanford Cardinal of the Pac-12 Conference.

Early years
Yurosek grew up in Bakersfield, California and attended Bakersfield Christian High School. As a senior he had 49 receptions for 741 yards and 11 touchdowns on offense and  made 81 tackles with 22 sacks and five forced fumbles as a defensive end. He also led Bakersfield Christian to a state championship in basketball. Yurosek was rated a three-star recruit and committed to play college football at Stanford over offers from Notre Dame, Washington, and UCLA.

College career
As a freshman, Yurosek played in all six of Stanford's games in the team's COVID-19-shortened 2020 season but did not catch a pass. As a sophomore, he caught 43 passes for 658 yards and three touchdowns. Yurosek was named preseason All-Pac-12 Conference and on the watchlist for the Mackey Award entering his junior season.

References

External links
Stanford Cardinal bio

Living people
American football tight ends
Stanford Cardinal football players
Players of American football from Bakersfield, California
Year of birth missing (living people)